Gao Hanyu  (born 6 February 1988), also known as Kido, is a Chinese actor and singer.

Career
In 2007, Gao participated in Dragon TV's singing competition Wo Xing Wo Xiu and emerged top ten in the finals. In 2008, he participated in Zhejiang TV's program Jue Dui Chang Xiang. In October 2008, he debuted as member of the Chinese boy group HIT-5.

In 2011, Gao made his acting debut in the television series Flight Attendant Diary.

In 2016, Gao starred in the science fiction web film series Alien and its sequel.

In 2017, Gao gained recognition for his performance in the fantasy action drama Fighter of the Destiny. He won the New Actor award at the China Film Fashion Influence Awards.

In 2018, Gao's popularity further increased with his performance in the crime mystery drama  S.C.I. Mystery. He received the Capable Actor of the Year award at the Golden Bud - The Third Network Film and Television Festival, and the Rising Actor award at the Silk Road Cohesion Awards. The same year, he starred in the fantasy adventure drama Legend of Fuyao. He also played the leading role in the romance drama Flipped.

In 2019, Gao starred in the esports web series The King's Avatar, earning increased popularity for his role as Yu Wenzhou.

In 2021, he joined the cast of the variety show Call Me By Fire as a contestant.

In 2022, Gao starred as the male lead in Hunan TV's romantic comedy drama Dine with Love.

Filmography

Film

Television series

Awards and nominations

References

1989 births
Living people
Male actors from Zhejiang
People from Taizhou, Zhejiang
Singers from Zhejiang
21st-century Chinese male actors
21st-century Chinese male singers
Chinese male television actors